Michel Henri Aumont (15 October 1936 – 28 August 2019) was a French theatre, film, and television actor. Throughout his career, he gained four Molière Awards and nominations for three César Awards. In 2015, he was made Grand Officer of the National Order of Merit.

Biography
Born October 15, 1936 in Paris. He studied at the Paris Conservatory of Dramatic Art.

From the  1970s, he became one of the leading comedic actors in French cinema, despite having played mostly supporting roles.

He worked on the Comédie-Française stage for thirty years.

Filmography

Awards
 Molière Award for Best Supporting Actor (1999)

References

External links 
 

1936 births
2019 deaths
French male film actors
French male television actors
Male actors from Paris
French National Academy of Dramatic Arts alumni
Grand Officers of the Ordre national du Mérite